Tarleton was launched in 1796 at Liverpool for Tarleton & Co., a Liverpool firm that had been in the slave trade for three generations. She made two full voyages as a slave ship in the triangular trade in enslaved people before she was wrecked on a third voyage in late 1798. On her first voyage she repelled two attacks by French privateers in single-ship actions. Unusually, but not uniquely, slaves helped work her guns.

Career
Radcliffe Shimmins, Tarletons master, received a letter of marque on 13 May 1796. She proceeded to make three cruises as a slaver between 1796 and 1798.

On her first slave trading voyage, Shimmins sailed Tarlton from Liverpool on 19 June 1796, and arrived at Loanga on 25 August. They left Africa on 26 October.

On 28 November Tarleton drove off a French privateer of 12 guns with a single broadside, and later that day succeeded in repelling another after an engagement of three hours. This second privateer mounted twenty 9-pounder guns on her main deck, and eight guns on her quarterdeck. Shimmins and his men, including some slaves that helped man the guns, sustained no casualties. Tarleton was approaching Barbados at the time and the next day arrived there.

Tarleton arrived at Martinique on 13 December. She had embarked 394 slaves and disembarked 380, for a mortality rate of 3.6%. Tarleton left Martinique on 9 January 1797 and arrived back at Liverpool on 13 April. On her voyage she had also lost four crew members; she had left Liverpool with 37 crew members.

On his second slave trading voyage, in 1797, Shimmins gathered his slaves in the Bight of Biafra at Bonny Island and Gulf of Guinea island, and delivered them to St. Vincent. He had arrived with 435. By the time Tarleton arrived back at Liverpool on 8 March 1798, she had lost five crew members; she had left Liverpool with 43 men.

Loss
Tarleton left Liverpool on 30 July 1798. In January 1799 Tarleton was reported to have been lost at Cape Palmas. She was lost before she had embarked any slaves.

In 1799, 18 British slave ships were lost. Seven, including Tarleton, were lost outbound before they could embark slaves.

Notes

Citations

References
 
 
 
 

1796 ships
Ships built in England
Age of Sail merchant ships
Merchant ships of the United Kingdom
Liverpool slave ships
Maritime incidents in 1798
Shipwrecks of Africa
Shipwrecks in the Atlantic Ocean